The Falkland Islands Gazette is the government gazette of the Falkland Islands Government. It has been published in Stanley since 1891.

See also
 List of British colonial gazettes
 Penguin News
 Falkland Islands Magazine

References

External links
 Jane Cameron National Archive online 

Government of the Falkland Islands
Publications established in 1891
British colonial gazettes